Cycrimine (trade name Pagitane) is a central anticholinergic drug designed to reduce the levels of acetylcholine in the treatment of Parkinson's disease. Its mechanism of action is to bind to the muscarinic acetylcholine receptor M1.

Synthesis

See also
Biperiden
Procyclidine
Trihexyphenidyl

References

External links
 Cycrimine at DrugLib.com

Phenyl compounds
1-Piperidinyl compounds
Antiparkinsonian agents
Cyclopentanes